Astrolabe Needle is a conspicuous monolith rising  above sea level south of Claude Point, Brabant Island, in the Palmer Archipelago. It was discovered by the 1903–1905 French Antarctic Expedition under Jean-Baptiste Charcot and named after the Astrolabe, one of the ships of the 1837–1840 French expedition under Captain Jules Dumont d'Urville.

References
 

Rock formations of the Palmer Archipelago
Brabant Island